In graph theory, the Nash-Williams theorem is a tree-packing theorem that describes how many edge-disjoint spanning trees (and more generally forests) a graph can have:A graph G has t edge-disjoint spanning trees iff for every partition  where  there are at least t(k − 1) crossing edges (Tutte 1961, Nash-Williams 1961).For this article, we will say that such a graph has arboricity t or is t-arboric. (The actual definition of arboricity is slightly different and applies to forests rather than trees.)

Related tree-packing properties 
A k-arboric graph is necessarily k-edge connected. The converse is not true.

As a corollary of NW, every 2k-edge connected graph is k-arboric.

Both NW and Menger's theorem characterize when a graph has k edge-disjoint paths between two vertices.

Nash-Williams theorem for forests 
NW (1964) generalized the above result to forests:G can be partitioned into t edge-disjoint forests iff for every , the induced subgraph G[U] has size .A proof is given here.

This is how people usually define what it means for a graph to be t-aboric.

In other words, for every subgraph S = G[U], we have . It is tight in that there is a subgraph S that saturates the inequality (or else we can choose a smaller t). This leads to the following formulaalso referred to as the NW formula.

The general problem is to ask when a graph can be covered by edge-disjoint subgraphs.

See also 

Arboricity
Bridge (cut edge)
 Menger's theorem
 Tree packing conjecture

References

External links 
  Paulson, Lawrence C. The Nash-Williams partition theorem (Formal proof development in Isabelle/HOL, Archive of Formal Proofs)

Graph theory